Robert Cary Blanchard (November 5, 1968 – September 6, 2016) was an American football placekicker in the National Football League. He played eight years for five teams: the New York Jets for his first two years, the Indianapolis Colts after taking 1994 off, the Washington Redskins in 1998, the New York Giants in 1999, and the Arizona Cardinals in his final season.

He graduated from L. D. Bell High School in Hurst, Texas in 1987. He then played college football at Oklahoma State University. He died in Mabank, Texas on September 6, 2016, at the age of 47.

References

1968 births
2016 deaths
Sportspeople from Fort Worth, Texas
American football placekickers
Oklahoma State Cowboys football players
Sacramento Surge players
New York Jets players
Indianapolis Colts players
Washington Redskins players
New York Giants players
American Conference Pro Bowl players